Rikard Spets (born March 19, 1971, in Trondheim) is a Norwegian writer from Sandefjord. He debuted in 2011 with the crime novel Allahs tårer.

Spets graduated in marketing and worked as a sales and marketing until in 2007 he resigned to pursue his dream of becoming a writer.

References

1971 births
Living people
Norwegian male writers